Sudden Danger is a 1955 American film noir crime drama directed by Hubert Cornfield and starring Bill Elliott, Beverly Garland, and Tom Drake.

Plot
Police detective Doyle (Elliott) is investigating the alleged suicide of a woman who heads a clothing manufacturing company. He suspects that the victim was murdered, and that the perpetrator was her son, Curtis (Drake), who was blinded by her in an accident several years before. Hoping to clear himself, Curtis begins searching for clues on his own. By fadeout time he and Doyle have cornered the actual killer.

Cast
 Bill Elliott as Lt. Andy Doyle  
 Tom Drake as Wallace Curtis  
 Beverly Garland as Phyllis Baxter  
 Dayton Lummis as Raymond Wilkins  
 Helene Stanton as Vera  
 Lucien Littlefield as Dave Glennon 
 Lyle Talbot as Harry Woodruff  
 Minerva Urecal as Mrs. Kelly  
 Frank Jenks as Kenny, the bartender  
 Pierre Watkin as George Caldwell

See also
Dial Red O (1955)
Calling Homicide (1956)
Chain of Evidence (1957)
Footsteps in the Night (1957)
List of American films of 1955

References

External links
 
 
 
 

1955 films
1955 crime drama films
Allied Artists films
American black-and-white films
American crime drama films
Film noir
Films directed by Hubert Cornfield
American police detective films
1955 directorial debut films
1950s English-language films
1950s American films